Ruan Ribeiro Teles (born 23 October 1997) is a Brazilian footballer who plays as a forward for Kazakhstanian side FC Caspiy.

Club career
Ruan made his professional debut for Varzim in a 1-0 LigaPro win over Real S.C. on 3 December 2017. On 10 January 2019, Teles transferred to Marítimo.

References

External links

ZeroZero Profile
Liga Portugal Profile

1997 births
Living people
Brazilian footballers
Association football forwards
Clube Atlético Mineiro players
Cruzeiro Esporte Clube players
Grêmio Esportivo Juventus players
C.S. Marítimo players
Varzim S.C. players
Tupi Football Club players
Villa Nova Atlético Clube players
FC Argeș Pitești players
Primeira Liga players
Liga Portugal 2 players
Campeonato de Portugal (league) players
Liga I players
Brazilian expatriate footballers
Brazilian expatriate sportspeople in Portugal
Expatriate footballers in Portugal
Brazilian expatriate sportspeople in Romania
Expatriate footballers in Romania